{{Infobox royalty
| name         = Sobekemsaf
| title        = Great Royal Wife 
Khenemetneferhedjet
| image        = Stele JE 16.2.22.23 Engelbach.jpg
| alt          = Stela depicting queen Sobekemsaf (center) along with other relatives.
| caption      = Stela depicting queen Sobekemsaf (center) along with other relatives.
| spouse       = Nubkheperre Intef
| father       = possibly Rahotep
| mother       = unnamed queen
| dynasty      = 17th of Egypt
}}

Sobekemsaf (sbk-m-z3=f) was an ancient Egyptian queen of the 17th Dynasty. She was the wife of pharaoh Nubkheperre Intef and sister of an unidentified pharaoh, probably Sekhemre-Heruhirmaat Intef, Sobekemsaf II or Senakhtenre Ahmose.Dodson & Hilton, p. 118

Her name ("Sobek protects him") is grammatically masculine. Although a female version of the name (sbk-m-z3=s) did exist, the queen is named Sobekemsaf in all sources, so it was not an error on the scribe's part, but she was probably named for an ancestor. Masculine names for females were not uncommon during the Second Intermediate Period.

Attestations
She is mentioned on a bracelet and a pendant, now both in the British Museum. 

In her family's hometown Edfu she is known from stelae. The first is Cairo CG 34009. The stela, belonging to an official called Yuf dated to the 18th Dynasty, mentions reconstruction of her tomb. Another stela, also from Edfu (Cairo JE 16.2.22.23), depicts queen Sobekemsaf along with other relatives;Polz, Daniel: "The Territorial Claim and the Political Role of the Theban State", in: Forstner-Müller & Moeller (eds.), The Hyksos Ruler Khyan and the Early Second Intermediate Period in Egypt: Problems and Priorities of Current Research. Proceedings of the Workshop of the Austrian Archaeological Institute and the Oriental Institute of the University of Chicago, Vienna, July 4 – 5, 2014, p. 229 the stela names the queen's sister Neferuni and their mother, whose name is lost.

Sobekemsaf's titles were: King's Wife (ḥm.t-nswt), Great Royal Wife (ḥmt-nỉswt wr.t), United with the White Crown (ẖnm.t-nfr-ḥḏ.t), King's Daughter (z3.t-nỉswt), and King's Sister (zn.t-nswt)''.

Sources

Queens consort of the Seventeenth Dynasty of Egypt